Dzmitry Tratsiakou (born 25 September 1993) is a Belarusian sprint canoeist.

He was selected to compete for Belarus at the 2019 European Games, where he won a bronze medal in the K-1 200 metres.

References

1993 births
Living people
Belarusian male canoeists
Canoeists at the 2019 European Games
European Games medalists in canoeing
European Games bronze medalists for Belarus